"Prodigal Blues" is a song by Billy Idol from his 1990 studio album Charmed Life. It was also released as the album's third and final single in December 1990.

Background and writing 
The song was written by Billy Idol. Speaking of its message, he told Sounds in 1990, "It's my father talking to me and me talking to [my son] Willem. By being angry, mad and crazy at times, I've shouted for an answer and all I've got back was my own echo. What I'm saying to Willem is what my father said to me – everybody has to leave the security of things they love to find out what they're all about. But you don't necessarily have to destroy yourself to do it.

Charts

References

External links 
 "Prodigal Blues" at Discogs

1990 singles
Songs written by Billy Idol
Billy Idol songs
Chrysalis Records singles
1990 songs
Song recordings produced by Keith Forsey